Scarabus is the third and the last studio album by British jazz rock band Ian Gillan Band, released in October 1977.

The album was reissued in 1982 by Virgin Records in the height of popularity of Ian Gillan's group Gillan (a CD edition followed in 1989). The CD reissue included an extra track, "My Baby Loves Me". This track, recorded live at the Budokan Hall, Tokyo, Japan, on 22 September 1977, was originally part of the double LP set Live at the Budokan, and had been omitted from the UK release in error.

Ian Gillan re-used the vocal melody of the title track "Scarabus" on the song "Disturbing the Priest" six years later, on the album Born Again (1983) during his short tenure with the British hard rock/heavy metal band Black Sabbath. The guitar riff on "Mercury High" is the same as the one played by guitarist Ray Fenwick on "Back USA" from his 1971 solo album Keep America Beautiful, Get a Haircut.

Cover
The "witch" on the US cover comes from an adaptation of the movie poster for the 1976 horror film The Witch Who Came from the Sea, which itself was based on an older Frank Frazetta painting.

Track listing
 All tracks written by Ian Gillan, John Gustafson, Ray Fenwick, Colin Towns and Mark Nauseef.

Side 1
 "Scarabus" – 4:53
 "Twin Exhausted" – 4:08
 "Poor Boy Hero" – 3:08
 "Mercury High" – 3:31
 "Pre-release" – 4:22

Side 2
 "Slags to Bitches" – 5:09
 "Apathy" – 4:19
 "Mad Elaine" – 4:15
 "Country Lights" – 3:16
 "Fool's Mate" – 4:19

Personnel
 Ian Gillan – vocals
 Colin Towns – keyboards and flutes
 Ray Fenwick – guitars and vocals
 John Gustafson – bass guitar and vocals
 Mark Nauseef – drums and percussion

Production
 Produced by Ian Gillan Band
 Recorded and mixed at Kingsway Recorders, London, July–August 1977
 Recording engineer – Paul Watkins
 Assistant engineers – Bob Broglia, Mark Perry

References

External links 
 Ian Gillan Band - Scarabus (1977) album review by Stephen Thomas Erlewine, credits & releases on AllMusic
 Ian Gillan Band - Scarabus (1977) album releases & credits on Discogs.com
 Ian Gillan Band - Scarabus (1977) album to be listened as stream on Spotify.com

1977 albums
Island Records albums
Ian Gillan albums